Boparai Kalan is a village of Punjab in the district of Ludhiana.

References

External links
 Boparai Kalan, Nakodar (Official)

Villages in Ludhiana district